John Thomas Kneebone  (4 September 1935 – 28 June 2020) was a New Zealand local politician and farming leader. He was a member of the Matamata County Council from 1959 to 1967, and was president of Federated Farmers between 1974 and 1977.

Early life and family
Born in Matamata on 4 September 1935, Kneebone was educated at Hinuera School and Matamata College. On 11 December 1965, he married Kay Alexander, and the couple went on to have three children.

Career
Kneebone was a farmer and company director, and was active in local politics and as a farming leader. He was an elected member of the Matamata County Council between 1959 and 1967. He was elected as president of Federated Farmers in 1974, and served in that position until 1977. He was appointed to the Waitangi Tribunal in 1989.

Kneebone was the inspiration behind the National Agricultural Fieldays, established in 1969, after visiting the United Kingdom on a Nuffield Scholarship in 1966. He also served as a member of the Land Settlement Board and the Soil Conservation and Rivers Control Council.

In the 1988 New Year Honours, Kneebone was appointed a Companion of the Order of St Michael and St George, for public services and services to agriculture.

Death
Kneebone died in Cambridge on 28 June 2020.

References

1935 births
2020 deaths
People from Matamata
People educated at Matamata College
New Zealand farmers
Local politicians in New Zealand
Members of the Waitangi Tribunal
New Zealand Companions of the Order of St Michael and St George